Chhattisgarh Special Public Security Act, 2005 (also called as Chhattisgarh Vishesh Jan Suraksha Adhiniyam, 2005) is a law  in the state of Chhattisgarh passed by the Chhattisgarh assembly in December 2005. The bill received the assent of the President of India and was brought into effect by notification issued on 12 April 2006.

The law

The People's Union for Democratic Rights pointed out that although this act was ostensibly meant to combat growing Maoist violence, all the Maoist groups operating in Chhattisgarh were already banned and declared unlawful organisations after the 2004 amendment to the Unlawful Activities - Act, 1967
It authorises the police to detain a person for committing acts, which among other things, show a "tendency to pose an obstacle to the administration of law". The act also states any person whose actions "encourage(s) the disobedience of the established law" will be considered "unlawful".

Commonwealth Human Rights Initiative, in a statement, said that the present definition of "unlawful activities" imperils free exercise of fundamental freedoms set out under Article 19 of the Constitution and illustratively it appears to restrict the right to hold public meetings; organise public protests; and oppose government policies through the media.

Arrests
Six organisations were banned under this act. Dr. Binayak Sen, General Secretary, Chhattisgarh People's Union for Civil Liberties was detained under this Act on 14 May 2007 allegedly for his linkages with the Communist Party of India (Maoist).

Criticism
Human rights activists says this legislation will lead to increased repression of human rights.

The People's Union for Democratic Rights said that this legislation is meant to suppress all political dissent in the state. This is evident from the fact that Maoist groups were already banned under 2004 amendments to the Unlawful Activities (Prevention) Act, 1967.

The Commonwealth Human Rights Initiative has expressed its reservations about the Act, and said it may become a potential instrument to throttle the right to free speech, legitimate dissent, and trample the fundamental rights enshrined in Articles 14, 19 and 21 of the Constitution.

Concerns on press freedom
The act bars the media from carrying reports of any kind of ‘unlawful activities’ in the state. International Federation of Journalists appealed to the President of India, not to give his assent to "this undemocratic legislation, and initiate public debate on the complex causes of conflict, rather than treat it as a law and order problem."

President Christopher Warren, in a statement, said, "Freedom of the press is a pre-requisite for the peaceful resolution of conflict, and restricting the media from carrying out its professional activities can only lead to more suspicion and misinformation. Under no circumstances has gagging the media and silencing journalists furthered the objective of tackling armed conflict. It is only when democratic debate and the free flow of accurate information is made possible is the cause of democracy furthered."

References

External links
 Unofficial English Translation of the Act
 PUDR Analysis on the act
 Chhattisgarh’s novel way to counter Naxals: Gun for journalists
 Commonwealth Human Rights Initiative statement
Chhattisgarh security act challenged in Supreme Court

Chhattisgarh state legislation
2005 in law
Naxalite–Maoist insurgency
Chhattisgarh Legislative Assembly